Cereal Partners Worldwide S.A. is a joint venture between General Mills and Nestlé, established in 1991 to produce breakfast cereals.  The company is headquartered in Lausanne, Switzerland, and markets cereals in more than 130 countries (except for the U.S. and Canada, where General Mills markets the cereals directly).

The company's cereals are sold under the Nestlé brand, although many originated from General Mills and some, such as Shredded Wheat and Shreddies, were once made by Nabisco. In Australia and New Zealand, some of CPW's products are sold under the Uncle Tobys brand. in 2022 the company started selling cereals under the General Mills brand but some cereal brands like Trix still continue to have the Nestlé brand.

They have an annual turnover of about two billion US dollars, and a workforce of about 4,000 employees. The company is headquartered in Lausanne.

Products
Breakfast cereals produced by Cereal Partners include:
 Cheerios 
 Honey Cheerios
 Chocapic
 Cookie Crisp 
 Curiously Cinnamon
 Fitness
 Golden Nuggets
 Lion Cereal
 Nesquik
 Shreddies 
 Frosted Shreddies 
 Coco Shreddies
 Shredded Wheat 
 Shredded Wheat Bitesize
 Trix

References

External links
 Cereal Partners UK
 Nestlé Cereals website on Cereal Partners

Food and drink companies established in 1991
Swiss companies established in 1991
Breakfast cereal companies
Food and drink companies of Switzerland
General Mills
Nestlé
Swiss brands
Joint ventures
Companies based in Lausanne